Nieves Navarro García (born November 11, 1938) is a retired Spanish-born Italian actress and fashion model. Navarro worked extensively in Italian cinema appearing alongside actors such as Totò and Lino Banfi in the 1960s and 1970s. She later adopted the Americanized stage name Susan Scott for many of her productions after 1969.

Navarro was also one of the first female stars of the Spaghetti Western genre making her feature film debut in A Pistol for Ringo and its sequel The Return of Ringo along with later appearances in The Big Gundown (1966), Long Days of Vengeance (1967), Light the Fuse... Sartana Is Coming (1970) and Adiós, Sabata (1971). In 1972, she married the Italian director and producer Luciano Ercoli, starring in many of his productions up until the early-1980s, and was familiar for her erotically-themed roles in giallo and sex comedies. She went into semi-retirement after 1983, making two last films in 1989. In recent years, she returned to live in her native Spain with her husband.

Career 

Navarro's career began as advertising and fashion model. The introduction of television in Spain in 1956 led to further appearances in commercials and other work in the industry during the next few years. She began her career as a film actress in Italy alongside Totò in the Lawrence of Arabia parody Toto of Arabia (1965), a Spanish-Italian co-production, in which she played Doris, a beautiful spy in the service of the British SIS, who charms the Sheik of Kuwait El Ali el Buzur (Fernando Sancho) and allows Totò to use her to drive the one hundred wives of the Sheik jealous.

Her early work in films took place in the Spaghetti Westerns that were shot regularly in her hometown of Almeria. In 1965, she appeared in A Pistol for Ringo, starring Giuliano Gemma, as the girlfriend of the Mexican bandit Sancho (Fernando Sancho). Navarro also appeared in the sequel The Return of Ringo, and supporting roles in The Big Gundown (1966), Long Days of Vengeance (1967), Light the Fuse... Sartana Is Coming (1970) and Adiós, Sabata (1971). Nieves also had leading roles in a number of action and horror films during this period and was among the protagonists of the film Death Walks At Midnight (1972), directed by Luciano Ercoli, who eventually became her husband.

She subsequently moved to Italy with Ercoli where she spent the rest of her career, starring in many of her husband's projects, which ended veering towards Italian erotica and "giallo" cinema. It was in the latter genre that highlighted her as a major star especially her appearances in the Emannuelle series, Emanuelle and the Last Cannibals (1977) and Emanuelle e Lolita (1978), directed by Joe D'Amato and Henri Sala respectively.

In 1983, Navarro attempted to return to Spanish cinema with films like Gianfranco Angelucci's drama Honey with Fernando Rey, but with less than expected success. She made two last films in 1989, Fiori di zucca and Casa di piacere, before going into retirement. In recent years, she has returned to Spain, settling in Barcelona with Ercoli.

Filmography

References

Further reading
Baldi, Alfredo. Schermi Proibiti: La Censura in Italia 1947-1988. Venice: Marsilio, 2002.
Bruschini, Antonio and Antonio Tentori, ed. Western all'italiana: The Specialists. Firenze: Glittering lmages, 1998.
Giusti, Marco. Dizionario del Western all'Italiana. Italy: Arnoldo Mondadori Editore, 2007.

External links
Nieves Navarro/Susan Scott at Cinemorgue.com

 

1938 births
Living people
People from Almería
People from Barcelona
Actresses from Rome
Spanish film actresses
Spaghetti Western actresses
Italian film actresses